Campomorone is a comune (municipality) in the Metropolitan City of Genoa in the Italian region Liguria, located about  north of Genoa.

Campomorone borders the following municipalities: Bosio, Ceranesi, Fraconalto, Genoa, Mignanego, and Voltaggio.

Transport
Campomorone does not own a railway station. The nearest is  Genova Pontedecimo, on the line from Genoa to Turin. From there, Campomorone can be reached by using several bus lines (see timetable:)

Twin towns — sister cities
Campomorone is twinned with:

  San Nicolás de los Arroyos, Argentina (2013)

References

External links
 Official website

Cities and towns in Liguria